Among the indigenous Mapuche people of Chile, there is those that practise traditional polygamy. In modern Chile polygamy has no legal recognition. This puts women whose marriages to their husbands are not legally recognized at a disadvantage to the legal wife who is in terms of securing inheritance. Polygamy is much less common today, particularly in comparison with the time preceding the Occupation of Araucanía (1861–1883), when the traditional Mapuche homeland was finally brought under control of the Chilean government. It survives as a chiefly rural practice, but has also been reported in the low-income peripheral communities of Santiago. Wives who share the same husband are often relatives, such as sisters, who live in the same community. According to folklore, polyandry among the Mapuche is reputed to exist at least historically, in which case the husbands may have been brothers, but no documentation exists attesting to this phenomenon. It is also in contradiction to the renewal of the warrior ethos (weichan) promoted by militant organizations such as Coordinadora Arauco-Malleco.

History
Prior to the arrival of the Spanish in the early 16th century, the practice of polygamy by the Mapuche people of South America’s Southern Cone region was a firmly rooted tradition. This fomented tensions in Colonial Chile as polygamy was considered a sin according to the Catholic doctrine of the settlers. Father Luis de Valdivia believed that peace and understanding between the Mapuche and Spanish was possible and sought to accomplish this through his policy of Defensive War, which after lobbying superiors in Spain and Rome, he was permitted to implement in 1612. Nevertheless, at the Parliament of Paicaví held between representatives of Spanish settlers and Mapuche tribes that same year, Valdivia ordered the detainment of the two wives and daughters of a toqui, Anganamón, on the basis of protecting them from polygamy. Historian Jorge Pinto Rodríguez described this act as "suicidal"; according to José Bengoa, the Mapuche were willing to negotiate with the Spanish on Christian proselytization and baptism, but that debate on polygamy was out of the question. Later in 1612, on December 9, Valdivia dispatched a party led by Father Horacio Vechi, one of the first Italian proselytizers of Christianity in Chile, on a missionary journey inland, to be escorted along the way by local chieftains. On the morning of December 14, Anganamón accompanied by Ynavilu, a Mapuche chieftain, ambushed and killed the traveling Jesuits and their five Mapuche escorts in retaliation for Valdivia taking his wives and daughters. The slain party came to be known as the "Martyrs of Elicura." 

Polygamy occupied an important role in Mapuche society during their armed rebellion against the Spanish colonial government, then later during independent Chile's military pacification of Araucanía, where rules of marriage were influenced by these conflicts. According to Guillaume Boccara, a Mapuche man that was monogamous or had few wives was perceived as being a poor warrior on account of their tradition of raptio. During the Arauco War and afterwards, polygamy enabled Mapuche chiefs to establish alliances through marriage, with the acquisition of more wives widening the possibilities for alliances. In general terms polygamy enables to increase the amount of reciprocal relationships for individual Mapuche men. In late colonial times and in the early republic some officials, known as capitanes de amigos, who were allowed to live among friendly Mapuche tribes south of the frontier often married Mapuche women, with some of them going as far as engaging in polygamy.

Footnotes

References

Bibliography

Polygamy
Polygamy